Dowden is an English family name. It is a patronymic from an Old English personal name, Dogod (probably a derivative of dugan ‘to avail’, ‘to be of use’), chiefly found in Gloucestershire and Somerset. Notable people with the surname include:

Abraham Dowden (1839–1907), American politician
Bradley Dowden (born 1942), American philosopher
Corey Dowden (born 1968), American football player in the National Football League
Edward Dowden (1843–1913), Irish critic and poet
Hester Dowden (1868–1949), Irish spiritual medium
John Dowden (1840–1910), Irish bishop
Ken Dowden (born 1950), English scholar
 Oliver Dowden (born 1978),  British Conservative Party politician, MP for Hertsmere since May 2015
Richard Dowden (born 1949), English journalist
Steve Dowden (born 1929), American football player in the National Football League

English-language surnames